The Tale of Mrs. Tittlemouse is a book written and illustrated by Beatrix Potter and first published by Frederick Warne & Co. in 1910. The book tells the story of a wood-mouse named Mrs. Thomasina Tittlemouse and her efforts to keep her house in order despite numerous uninvited visitors, particularly Mr. Jackson, a sloppy toad. The protagonist Mrs. Tittlemouse first appeared in The Tale of the Flopsy Bunnies. An animated film adaptation of the story was featured on the BBC television anthology series, The World of Peter Rabbit and Friends in 1992.

Plot

The story chronicles the hardships of the wood-mouse Mrs. Tittlemouse, who tries to keep a tidy house. She turns away several unwanted visitors: beetles, a ladybird, and a big fat spider seeking shelter from the rain. In a distant passage she runs into Babbitty Bumble, a bumblebee, and in a storeroom she comes across a nest of four more bees, whom she fails to remove. 

Upon returning to her parlour, she finds the neighbour from the drain below, Mr. Jackson the toad, sitting in her rocking chair, all wet and dripping. He stays over dinner, but declines to eat the food Mrs. Tittlemouse offers him; she mops up his footprints as he rummages for honey. When Mr. Jackson finds the bees he pulls out their nest. 

Following Mr. Jackson's departure, Mrs. Tittlemouse spends a fortnight on cleaning the mess created in her home. She uses twigs to make her front door narrower. She then holds a party for five other little mice, with Mr. Jackson sitting outside drinking honey, as he can no longer fit through the door.

Nursery rhyme references
Mrs. Tittlemouse sends the uninvited ladybird off with a variant of  the traditional nursery rhyme Ladybird Ladybird: "Your house is on fire, Mother Ladybird! Fly away home to your children!". She then runs into a spider who asks her: "Beg pardon, is this not Miss Muffet's?", a reference to the nursery rhyme Little Miss Muffet.

Adaptions
An animated adaptation of the story, shown interspersed with The Tale of the Flopsy Bunnies, was featured on The World of Peter Rabbit and Friends in 1992.

References

Further reading

External links

 The Tale of Mrs Tittlemouse at the Internet Archive
Peter Rabbit official website

1910 children's books
 British children's books
Mrs. Tittlemouse, The Tale of Mrs.
Tittlemouse
Picture books by Beatrix Potter
Frederick Warne & Co books